The Program is a 1993 American drama film starring James Caan, Halle Berry, Omar Epps, Craig Sheffer, Kristy Swanson, and Joey Lauren Adams. The film was directed by David S. Ward who has directed and written other Hollywood films such as the Major League series.

The film touches on the season of the fictional Division I FBS (then IA) college football team, the Eastern State University (ESU) Timberwolves as they deal with the pressure to make a bowl game, alcohol and anabolic steroid abuse, receipt of improper benefits, and overall college life. It follows the trials of Coach Sam Winters (Caan), the Heisman Trophy candidate Joe Kane (Sheffer), the freshman running back Darnell Jefferson (Epps), their love interests (Berry and Swanson), and other team members.

The film was released by Touchstone Pictures in September 1993. The film went on to gross over $20 million at the box office. The film was shot on location at several American universities, including: Boston College, Duke University, the University of Michigan, the University of Iowa, and the University of South Carolina. While the college that is the main setting of the film is fictional, the team's opponents are real programs.  The film includes a cameo appearance from Michigan coaching legend Bo Schembechler.

Plot

The ESU Timberwolves start optimistically, although Coach Sam Winters must win this season or be fired. Sophomore quarterback Joe Kane spends Christmas with his alcoholic family while junior Alvin Mack gives his mother a door knocker for the house he will buy when he turns pro. Running back Darnell Jefferson is recruited to ESU. Autumn (Berry), an ESU student, gives him a tour; they bond and kiss.

Kane introduces Jefferson to Mack, backup quarterback Bobby Collins (dating Winters' daughter Louanne) and senior Steve Lattimer, (35 pounds heavier since last fall), hopeful starter in his senior year. Fumbling at practice, Jefferson must carry a football with him at all times. Coach Winters tells him if anyone but Jefferson returns the ball to him "...[you'll wish you were never born.]" Jefferson discovers Autumn is back with starting tailback Ray Griffen (his competition for starting running back). Later, worried about entrance exams and asking for advice, Lattimer passes on his fourth try. Mack gets test copies beforehand.

Illiterate, Mack tells Jefferson he will stay eligible if he's talented; he only needs to know how to sign an NFL contract. Jefferson is neither surprised nor worried when he fails the test; he convinces Autumn to tutor him. Sports Illustrated declares Kane a Heisman Trophy candidate; the pressure and stress cause him to drink. Meeting tennis player Camille (Swanson) after riding on his motorcycle, they start dating.

Mack, a junior, is waiting for April's NFL Draft, clearly indifferent to academics. His strong ability to understand strategy during film study shows his commitment to football. Meanwhile, the offensive coordinator fears Lattimer is on steroids, but Winters trusts him. If he is, NCAA testing will catch him.

When Lattimer is named starting defensive end, he shatters car windows with his head, screaming, "STARTING DEFENSE!! PLACE AT THE TABLE!!" Witnessed by the coordinators, they do not tell Winters, but warn Lattimer the NCAA will be drug-testing at the start of the season. The Heisman campaign for Kane picks up speed and the players' individual motivation is revealed: Kane plays because it distracts him from the stressors of his life (his alcoholic father), Jefferson is escaping the ghetto, Mack enjoys the physicality & Lattimer genuinely loves the game.

Lattimer substitutes clean urine for his own during the NCAA drug tests. They have a stream of victories initially. Meanwhile, Griffen isn't being effective as tailback, and Jefferson is doing well. Uncomfortable with monetary donations from wealthy alumni as he improves, Mack tells him to take it. Jefferson and Autumn begin a relationship, but she is ashamed to tell her well-read father, another former ESU football player. She goes back with Griffen, who plans to attend medical school.

Winters' daughter is expelled for cheating for Collins; he is kicked off the team and expelled. When Kane and ESU lose a close game to Michigan, with another Heisman candidate, he is put in doubt. Lattimer assaults a girl who won't put out, but her dad gets her to drop the charges. When Winters sees Lattimer is juicing, he wants to suspend him for the season, but his defensive coordinator warns him it could jeopardize his draft status. Lattimer is suspended for three games after confessing to Winters, but they keep the doping secret. When Mack criticizes him, Lattimer says, "You do what you have to do to play."

After the Michigan game, Kane gets drunk, fights someone and sends the other man to the hospital. Taking another player's truck, he is charged with a DWI. Coach Winters negotiates a plea with the DA: all charges dropped if Kane completes a 28-day program (missing four games and ending his Heisman candidacy). They must win three more games in the next five weeks to win the conference championship and secure a major bowl game, so need a capable quarterback.

School officials pressure Winters into reinstating Collins for Kane. He reluctantly agrees, vouching for him. (Despite his daughter being expelled for cheating for him.) Collins and the team go 2-1 in the first three games. Lattimer passes his drug test after the three weeks, returning for the penultimate game of the season against Iowa.

The game is close, but Mack has a career-ending knee injury and Lattimer is run over at the goal line. Kane finishes his 28-days, reaching out to Camille, whom he didn't speak to in rehab, and also to his father. He buys him a plane ticket to the final game against Georgia Tech. Meanwhile, Lattimer continues to take steroids, having an associate replace his tainted urine with clean to pass his next drug test.

ESU's final game is against Georgia Tech for the Eastern Athletic Conference (EAC) and to secure a major bowl game. Jefferson is the starting tailback and Griffen is fullback. Despite Mack's absence the defense keeps them in the game, but GT leads 10-0 at the half. Kane starts in the 2nd half. Realizing his dad is not there, he accepts it. Winter realizes Lattimer has continued taking steroids without failing a drug test. Lattimer looks guilty although Winters seems to understand. Kane rallies the team to victory in the fourth quarter, securing a major bowl game and saving Winters' job. They both realize Kane will likely make another run at the Heisman as a senior. Lattimer sits on the bench crying instead of celebrating, realizing he won't be able to play professionally without steroids.

After the game, Autumn presents Jefferson to her father as her boyfriend. Kane reunites with Camille, offering her another ride (this time with Sprite, not beer) and the coaches go recruit for next year.

Cast

Production
Principal photography took place in and around Columbia, South Carolina, with the University of South Carolina doubling as ESU and Williams-Brice Stadium serving as the Timberwolves' home stadium. A significant amount of filming also took place on the campus of Duke University.

Last names of the crew members were used on the back of jerseys for the extras who stood in as football players.

Bo Schembechler and Lynn Swann make cameo appearance playing themselves as commentators in the film.

Reception
Rotten Tomatoes, a review aggregator, reports that 43% of 21 reviewers gave the film a positive review; the average rating is 5.1/10.  James Berardinelli said, "prepare to be inundated by a load of feeble, unimaginative material that's almost impossible to take seriously."  Norman Chad of The Washington Post referred to the film as "one big cliche".

Roger Ebert rated the film three stars out of four, putting particular emphasis on the amount of time spent on the relative ease in passing an NCAA drug test, saying "[a]nd the movie seems expert on how a lineman could pump himself full of steroids and still pass the NCAA drug tests."  Janet Maslin of The New York Times called it "routine" but praised the performance of Andrew Bryniarski, saying, "[w]hen high on steroids, he turns into a competition-crazed monster, but the film manages to make him likable anyhow."  Reviewing it on video, Entertainment Weekly gave the film a B− and wrote that it is better than its reputation.

Removed scene
The film originally included a scene in which Kane lies down in the middle of a road on the lane divider, cars barely missing him as they  move at highway speeds. Reading aloud from a Sports Illustrated college football preview issue with him on the front cover, he comically remarks, "They're talking about how good I am under pressure." Several team members who are at first trying to stop Kane decide that it is a test of their bravery and team unity and join him.

Influenced by the scene, in October 1993, teenagers imitated it in two separate real-life incidents, resulting in one death and two injuries.  This resulted in the scene being removed from the film after its release. A brief clip of the scene in question showing team members lying in the street had already been aired repeatedly in the television commercials for the film and therefore captured on VCRs. Later versions of the trailer had the clip removed.

The only known home video releases with this scene intact are the Hong Kong laserdisc published by Taishan International and the Australian DVD release.  The Hong Kong release is three minutes longer than the theatrical cut and clocks in at a 115-minute run time.

References

External links
 
 
 

1993 films
1993 drama films
American football films
American drama films
Films shot in North Carolina
Films shot in South Carolina
The Samuel Goldwyn Company films
Touchstone Pictures films
Films scored by Michel Colombier
Films set in universities and colleges
1990s English-language films
Films directed by David S. Ward
1990s American films